Charlotte Cecilia af Tibell (January 29, 1820 – April 16, 1901) was a Swedish author and hymnwriter. She also wrote Christian short stories and feminist stories against egoistic men.

Biography
Among other things, she wrote hymns and published the hymn collection Flowers by the Road to Zion under the name C. T., 1852–1867. She was friends with hymnwriters Agatha Rosenius and Lina Sandell.

Bibliography

Reference

Further reading

External links

1820 births
1901 deaths
Swedish writers